Rutland County Council is the local authority for the unitary authority of Rutland in the East Midlands of England. The current council was created in April 1997. The population of the council's area at the 2011 census was 37,369.

As a unitary authority, the council is responsible for almost all local services in Rutland, with the exception of the Leicestershire Fire and Rescue Service and Leicestershire Police, which are run by joint boards with Leicestershire County Council and Leicester City Council.

History

First incarnation
Rutland County Council was first established in 1889 by the Local Government Act 1888 and ended in 1974 by the Local Government Act 1972, when Rutland was reconstituted as a district of Leicestershire.

Second incarnation
The new unitary authority is seen as a re-creation of the original Rutland County Council. The Local Government Commission for England in 1994 recommended that Rutland District (and Leicester City) should become unitaries and leave the two-tier Leicestershire. Rutland unitary authority came into existence on 1 April 1997.

Formally it is a unitary district with the full legal title of Rutland County Council District Council, caused by a renaming of the District of Rutland using powers under section 74 of the Local Government Act 1972 at a special meeting of the council held on 1 April 1997. Although, as with other unitary councils, the council is technically a non-metropolitan district council, section 8 of the Leicestershire (City of Leicester and District of Rutland) (Structural Change) Order 1996 created a county covering the same area as the District of Rutland, and further provided that there would be no council for the County of Rutland.

Composition

The council consists of 27 councillors, representing fifteen electoral wards of the county. It has all-out elections on a four-year cycle and follows a district pattern, with elections held in May 2007, May 2011, 2015 and 2019.

The ceremonial head of the council is the chairman, and the executive follows the leader-and-cabinet model.

The current council is led by a cabinet of Conservatives and independents  following the collapse of the previous Conservative minority administration in May 2022. The other parties represented on the council are the Liberal Democrats, Labour and the Greens.

Cabinet
The Cabinet prepares Council policies and budgets and is responsible for most day-to-day decision making. The Cabinet also provides leadership and accountability for the local community. Each of the Cabinet Members are responsible for a specified policy area.

The Cabinet works to a Forward Plan that sets out matters which the Leader of the Council believes will be the subject of a key decision to be taken by the Cabinet.

The Cabinet comprises the Leader of the Council plus up to five elected Councillors, as of May 2022 these consist of:

Lucy Stephenson - Leader and Portfolio Holder for Resources and Property

Rosemary Powell - Deputy Leader and Portfolio Holder for Planning, Highways and Transport

Marc Oxley - Portfolio Holder for Communities, Environment and Climate Change

Samantha Harvey – Portfolio Holder for Health, Wellbeing and Adult Care

Karen Payne - Portfolio Holder for Finance, Governance and Performance, Change and Transformation

David Wilby - Portfolio Holder for Education and Children’s Services

Members by party

Wards 

The county is divided into electoral wards, returning one, two or three councillors. The previous wards were adopted for the 2003 local elections but amended before the 2019 elections.

2016 EU Referendum

On 23 June 2016 Rutland voted in only the third major UK-wide referendum on the issue of the United Kingdom's membership of the European Union in the 2016 EU Referendum under the provisions of the European Union Referendum Act 2015 where voters were asked to decide on the question “Should the United Kingdom remain a member of the European Union or leave the European Union” by voting for either “Remain a member of the European Union” or “Leave the European Union”. The county produced one of the narrowest results in the country by voting to “Leave the European Union” by a majority of just 260 votes. The result went against the views of the local MP Alan Duncan who had campaigned for a "Remain" vote.

The result was declared in Oakham early on  24 June 2016 by the Counting Officer, Helen Briggs.

Arms

See also
 Rutland County Council elections

Notes

References

External links
Rutland County Council

 
Unitary authority councils of England
Leader and cabinet executives
Local education authorities in England
Local authorities in Rutland
Billing authorities in England
Uppingham
Ketton
Oakham